The 2004 Canadian Grand Prix (officially the Formula 1 Grand Prix du Canada 2004) was a Formula One motor race held on 13 June 2004 at the Circuit Gilles Villeneuve. It was Race 8 of 18 in the 2004 FIA Formula One World Championship.

It was won by Michael Schumacher, with teammate Rubens Barrichello second, making for a 1-2 finish for Scuderia Ferrari Marlboro as part of a season where Ferrari took the most wins of the season and the driver's championship.

In the post race inspections, Williams and Toyota were excluded from the race due to illegal brake ducts.

This would be the last time that Scuderia Ferrari won in Canada until the 2018 Canadian Grand Prix, at the same circuit.

Friday drivers
The bottom 6 teams in the 2003 Constructors' Championship were entitled to run a third car in free practice on Friday. These drivers drove on Friday but did not compete in qualifying or the race.

Report 
The 2004 Canadian Grand Prix nearly did not happen, originally being dropped from the calendar in 2003 but later reinstated. The issue was to do with tobacco sponsorship.

It was the eighth race of the 2004 Formula One season, and was the first of two North American consecutive rounds. The Canadian Grand Prix 2004 was one of drama, but at the finish line Michael Schumacher took his 77th career victory, his 7th win of the 2004 season, and his 7th win in Canada. Timo Glock made his debut replacing Giorgio Pantano who did not compete due to personal circumstances. The Renaults were fast off the line as was expected, but a suspension failure put Jarno Trulli out of the race before he'd reached the second corner. Takuma Sato starting from the pit lane had a close shave with the two Jaguars and David Coulthard. Christian Klien's Jaguar was hit from behind, propelling him into the McLaren of Coulthard, which also resulted in a collision with Mark Webber who was forced to pit with a punctured tyre, but later retired with suspension failure.

After the start, Fernando Alonso was up to third behind pole sitter Ralf Schumacher and Jenson Button. Jordan debutante Timo Glock took advantage of the second corner tangle and managed to find himself in 10th. As the race progressed, Rubens Barrichello moved ahead of Kimi Räikkönen into 6th position, as Glock was forced back by faster cars. Sauber's Felipe Massa battled with the ailing Takuma Sato for 14th, as Coulthard moved up to 12th, with the Toyotas in a strong 8th and 9th. The McLaren's were first to pit as part of their three stop strategy, followed shortly by Button and Montoya. Ralf Schumacher was 5 seconds ahead of Alonso until he pitted and rejoined in fourth, whilst Alonso's podium hopes were later dashed by a problem with the fuel hose which forced the Renault pit crew to resort to the spare hose, costing Alonso an additional 16 seconds. Räikkönen's afternoon couldn't get much worse, as he served a drive through penalty for crossing the white line on his exit from the pit lane. Barrichello later rejoined after his first pit stop behind Montoya, to make the running order Ralf Schumacher, Jenson Button, Michael Schumacher, Juan Pablo Montoya, Rubens Barrichello and Fernando Alonso.

Nick Heidfeld was involved in an incident in the pit lane where the lollipop man lifted whilst the fuel hose was still attached, and the fuel man Mick Gomme was dragged along as the Jordan pulled away. The Saubers were on a long first stint and Giancarlo Fisichella did not pit until lap 25, surprisingly rejoining in the points. Meanwhile, Button was closing the gap to Ralf Schumacher, as Montoya did likewise to Ralf's older brother Michael.

Minardi's Gianmaria Bruni was hauled in for a drive through penalty for speeding in the pit lane, but retired with gearbox failure shortly after. Ralf pitted again on lap 33, and rejoined in 3rd whilst Coulthard narrowly missed another collision with a fiery Christian Klien. In the second stint, Barrichello was seemingly much faster than his teammate Michael Schumacher, but could not find a way past the reigning champion. Alonso began to fly in fourth, as the adventurous Klien took an airborne trip over the grass. Alonso's charge was short-lived though, as his Renault pulled slowly to the side of the circuit with a driveshaft failure. Räikkönen, Barrichello and Michael Schumacher took their second pit stops without much hassle, although Schumacher had a leary moment when he almost hit the pit wall.

Ralf Schumacher then took his third and final stop, and so too did Montoya and Button. Takuma Sato's disappointing afternoon ended with the Honda engine exploding. As the final stages of the race approached, Michael Schumacher led brother Ralf, with Barrichello, Button, and Montoya following, and Räikkönen in sixth. Räikkönen then had to make yet another pit stop to change his steering wheel, dropping the Finn down to 7th.

With a few laps left to go, Felipe Massa suffered a rear suspension failure at the hairpin, a wheel flying beyond the retaining fence (nobody was injured) as his Sauber flew into the tyre barrier. The Brazilian was taken to hospital for precautionary tests, but was basically unharmed. Christian Klien continued an entertaining afternoon by spinning 360 degrees, narrowly avoiding a surprised Timo Glock.

The front runners remained the same until the chequered flag, Michael Schumacher and Scuderia Ferrari coming away with a 7th victory of the season. Younger brother Ralf, and Barrichello completed the podium portrait. Jenson Button ended the race in 4th, and Montoya finished in 5th. Giancarlo Fisichella's quiet race ended with an impressive 6th, with Räikkönen taking two points for seventh and Toyota's Cristiano da Matta taking the final point for 8th.

After the race, however, both Toyota's and Williams's cars were disqualified with brake irregularities, brake ducts seemingly not conforming to regulations. After the disqualification, Jenson Button claimed 3rd, with Giancarlo Fisichella taking 4th, Räikkönen and Coulthard taking 5th and 6th, and Glock and Nick Heidfeld in 7th and 8th respectively, giving Jordan points.

Classification

Qualifying

Race

 Takuma Sato and Gianmaria Bruni started from the pit lane.

Championship standings after the race 

Drivers' Championship standings

Constructors' Championship standings

Note: Only the top five positions are included for both sets of standings.

References 

Canadian Grand Prix
Canadian Grand Prix
Grand Prix
2000s in Montreal
2004 in Quebec
Canadian Grand Prix